The 2004–05 season in English football was Aston Villa F.C.'s 13th consecutive season in the FA Premier League, and their second season under the management of David O'Leary.

Villa went into the season with high hopes after finishing sixth during the 2003–04 FA Premier League season, despite an inconsistent start Villa soon begun to string wins together and threaten the top six but in the run up to Christmas Villas form dropped alarmingly and they fell away quickly, occasional wins put any relegation worry's astray as they underachieved and eventually secured a tenth-place finish.

Final league table

Results

Premier League

FA Cup

League Cup

Players

First-team squad
Squad at end of season

Left club during season

Reserve squad

Youth squad

Other players
The following players did not play for any Aston Villa team this season.

Statistics

Appearances and goals
As of end of season

|-
! colspan=14 style=background:#dcdcdc; text-align:center| Goalkeepers

|-
! colspan=14 style=background:#dcdcdc; text-align:center| Defenders

|-
! colspan=14 style=background:#dcdcdc; text-align:center| Midfielders

|-
! colspan=14 style=background:#dcdcdc; text-align:center| Forwards

|-

Starting 11

Pre-season

Transfers

In

Out

References

Notes

External links
Aston Villa official website
avfchistory.co.uk 2004–05 season

Aston Villa F.C. seasons
Aston Villa